Ibolya Petrika (born 27 May 1957) is a Hungarian former sprinter who competed in the 1980 Summer Olympics.

References

1957 births
Living people
Hungarian female sprinters
Olympic athletes of Hungary
Athletes (track and field) at the 1980 Summer Olympics